Alex Coutts (born 25 September 1983) is a Scottish former professional road cyclist.

Major results

2000
 1st Overall Junior Tour of Wales
1st Stage 3
2001
 1st Overall Junior Tour of Wales
1st Stages 1 & 2
 1st Stage 1 (ITT) Junior Tour of Ireland
2005
 2nd Road race, National Under-23 Road Championships
 9th Overall Tour de Serbie
2007
 8th Grand Prix Cristal Energie
 9th Overall Tour de Serbie
2008
 1st  Overall Tour of Thailand
2009
 10th Overall Tour de Taiwan
2010
 7th Overall Tour of Singkarak
2011
 7th Overall Le Tour de Filipinas

References

External links

Living people
1983 births
Scottish male cyclists
Sportspeople from Midlothian
Cyclists at the 2006 Commonwealth Games
Commonwealth Games competitors for Scotland